Victor Vasilyevich Mikhaylov (born 4 July 1951) is a Russian actor. He appeared in more than forty films since 1979.

In 1972 he graduated from the Belarusian Theatrical Institute.

Selected filmography

References

External links 

1951 births
Living people
Russian male film actors
Soviet male film actors
Russian male stage actors
Soviet male stage actors
Male actors from Saint Petersburg
20th-century Russian male actors
21st-century Russian male actors